"Treading Water" is a song by British singer Alex Clare, from his debut studio album The Lateness of the Hour. It was released on 27 May 2011 as a digital download in the United Kingdom as the third single from the album. The song was written by Jarrad Rogers, Francis White, Alex Clare and produced by Mike Spencer. It has peaked to number 62 on the German Singles Chart.

Music video
A music video to accompany the release of "Treading Water" was first released onto YouTube on 3 June 2011 at a total length of three minutes and forty-five seconds.

In the music video, We are set in a car park with Alex sitting inside a car with his girlfriend. However the girlfriend then leaves the car angry and walks off leaving Alex behind. In between shots we have Alex singing with the girlfriend crying. Into another verse the car slowly begins to fill with water as it then begins to pour in faster. It then goes into another mix shot between Alex and the girlfriend as the water rises in the car. At the end of the music video Alex is nearly submerged before he opens the car door letting out the water inside the car as the video fades out.

Track listing

Credits and personnel
Lead vocals – Alex Clare
Songwriters – Jarrad Rogers, Francis White, Alex Clare
Producer – Mike Spencer
Label: Island

Chart performance

Release history

References

2011 singles
Alex Clare songs
Songs written by Jarrad Rogers
Songs written by Eg White